The Airbus A300 is a wide-body airliner developed and manufactured by Airbus.

In September 1967, aircraft manufacturers in the United Kingdom, France, and West Germany signed a memorandum of understanding to develop a large airliner.
West Germany and France reached an agreement on 29 May 1969 after the British withdrew from the project on 10 April 1969.
European collaborative aerospace manufacturer Airbus Industrie was formally created on 18 December 1970 to develop and produce it. The prototype first flew on 28 October 1972.

The first twin-engine widebody airliner, the A300 typically seats 247 passengers in two classes over a range of 5,375 to 7,500 km (2,900 to 4,050 nmi).

Initial variants are powered by General Electric CF6-50 or Pratt & Whitney JT9D turbofans and have a three-crew flight deck.
The improved A300-600 has a two-crew cockpit and updated CF6-80C2 or PW4000 engines; it made its first flight on 8 July 1983 and entered service later that year.
The A300 is the basis of the smaller A310 (first flown in 1982) and was adapted in a freighter version.
Its cross section was retained for the larger four-engined A340 (1991) and the larger twin-engined A330 (1992).
It is also the basis for the oversize Beluga transport (1994).

Launch customer Air France introduced the type on 23 May 1974.
After limited demand initially, sales took off as the type was proven in early service, beginning three decades of steady orders.
It has a similar capacity to the Boeing 767-300, introduced in 1986, but lacked the 767-300ER range.
During the 1990s, the A300 became popular with cargo aircraft operators, as both passenger airliner conversions and as original builds.
Production ceased in July 2007 after 561 deliveries.
, there were 229 A300 family aircraft in commercial service.

Development

Origins

During the 1960s, European aircraft manufacturers such as Hawker Siddeley and the British Aircraft Corporation, based in the UK, and Sud Aviation of France, had ambitions to build a new 200-seat airliner for the growing civil aviation market. While studies were performed and considered, such as a stretched twin-engine variant of the Hawker Siddeley Trident and an expanded development of the British Aircraft Corporation (BAC) One-Eleven, designated the BAC Two-Eleven, it was recognized that if each of the European manufacturers were to launch similar aircraft into the market at the same time, neither would achieve sales volume needed to make them viable. In 1965, a British government study, known as the Plowden Report, had found British aircraft production costs to be between 10% and 20% higher than American counterparts due to shorter production runs, which was in part due to the fractured European market. To overcome this factor, the report recommended the pursuit of multinational collaborative projects between the region's leading aircraft manufacturers.

European manufacturers were keen to explore prospective programs; the proposed 260-seat wide-body HBN 100 between Hawker Siddeley, Nord Aviation, and Breguet Aviation being one such example. National governments were also keen to support such efforts amid a belief that American manufacturers could dominate the European Economic Community; in particular, Germany had ambitions for a multinational airliner project to invigorate its aircraft industry, which had declined considerably following the Second World War. During the mid-1960s, both Air France and American Airlines had expressed interest in a short-haul twin-engine wide-body aircraft, indicating a market demand for such an aircraft to be produced. In July 1967, during a high-profile meeting between French, German, and British ministers, an agreement was made for greater cooperation between European nations in the field of aviation technology, and "for the joint development and production of an airbus". The word airbus at this point was a generic aviation term for a larger commercial aircraft, and was considered acceptable in multiple languages, including French.

Shortly after the July 1967 meeting, French engineer Roger Béteille was appointed as the technical director of what would become the A300 program, while Henri Ziegler, chief operating office of Sud Aviation, was appointed as the general manager of the organization and German politician Franz Josef Strauss became the chairman of the supervisory board. Béteille drew up an initial work share plan for the project, under which French firms would produce the aircraft's cockpit, the control systems, and lower-center portion of the fuselage, Hawker Siddeley would manufacture the wings, while German companies would produce the forward, rear and upper part of the center fuselage sections. Addition work included moving elements of the wings being produced in the Netherlands, and Spain producing the horizontal tail plane.

An early design goal for the A300 that Béteille had stressed the importance of was the incorporation of a high level of technology, which would serve as a decisive advantage over prospective competitors. As such, the A300 would feature the first use of composite materials of any passenger aircraft, the leading and trailing edges of the tail fin being composed of glass fibre reinforced plastic. Béteille opted for English as the working language for the developing aircraft, as well against using Metric instrumentation and measurements, as most airlines already had US-built aircraft. These decisions were partially influenced by feedback from various airlines, such as Air France and Lufthansa, as an emphasis had been placed on determining the specifics of what kind of aircraft that potential operators were seeking. According to Airbus, this cultural approach to market research had been crucial to the company's long-term success.

Workshare and redefinition

On 26 September 1967, the British, French, and West German governments signed a Memorandum of Understanding to start development of the 300-seat Airbus A300. At this point, the A300 was only the second major joint aircraft programme in Europe, the first being the Anglo-French Concorde. Under the terms of the memorandum, Britain and France were each to receive a 37.5 per cent work share on the project, while Germany received a 25 per cent share. Sud Aviation was recognized as the lead company for A300, with Hawker Siddeley being selected as the British partner company. At the time, the news of the announcement had been clouded by the British Government's support for the Airbus, which coincided with its refusal to back BAC's proposed competitor, the BAC 2–11, despite a preference for the latter expressed by British European Airways (BEA).
The program cost was US$4.6 billion (in 1993 Dollars).

In December 1968, the French and British partner companies (Sud Aviation and Hawker Siddeley) proposed a revised configuration, the 250-seat Airbus A250. It had been feared that the original 300-seat proposal was too large for the market, thus it had been scaled down to produce the A250. For increased flexibility, the cabin floor was raised so that standard LD3 freight containers could be accommodated side-by-side, allowing more cargo to be carried. Refinements made by Hawker Siddeley to the wing's design provided for greater lift and overall performance; this gave the aircraft the ability to climb faster and attain a level cruising altitude sooner than any other passenger aircraft. It was later renamed the A300B.

Perhaps the most significant change of the A300B was that it would not require new engines to be developed, being of a suitable size to be powered by Rolls-Royce's RB211, or alternatively the American Pratt & Whitney JT9D and General Electric CF6 powerplants; this switch was recognized as considerably reducing the project's development costs. To attract potential customers in the US market, it was decided that General Electric CF6-50 engines would power the A300 in place of the British RB207; these engines would be produced in co-operation with French firm Snecma. By this time, Rolls-Royce had been concentrating their efforts upon developing their RB211 turbofan engine instead and progress on the RB207's development had been slow for some time, the firm having suffered due to funding limitations, both of which had been factors in the engine switch decision.

On 10 April 1969, a few months after the decision to drop the RB207 had been announced, the British government announced that they would withdraw from the Airbus venture. In response, West Germany proposed to France that they would be willing to contribute up to 50% of the project's costs if France was prepared to do the same. Additionally, the managing director of Hawker Siddeley, Sir Arnold Alexander Hall, decided that his company would remain in the project as a favoured sub-contractor, developing and manufacturing the wings for the A300, which would later become pivotal in later versions' impressive performance from short domestic to long intercontinental flights. Hawker Siddeley spent £35 million of its own funds, along with a further £35 million loan from the West German government, on the machine tooling to design and produce the wings.

Programme launch

On 29 May 1969, during the Paris Air Show, French transport minister Jean Chamant and German economics minister Karl Schiller signed an agreement officially launching the Airbus A300, the world's first twin-engine widebody airliner. The intention of the project was to produce an aircraft that was smaller, lighter, and more economical than its three-engine American rivals, the McDonnell Douglas DC-10 and the Lockheed L-1011 TriStar. In order to meet Air France's demands for an aircraft larger than 250-seat A300B, it was decided to stretch the fuselage to create a new variant, designated as the A300B2, which would be offered alongside the original 250-seat A300B, henceforth referred to as the A300B1. On 3 September 1970, Air France signed a letter of intent for six A300s, marking the first order to be won for the new airliner.

In the aftermath of the Paris Air Show agreement, it was decided that, in order to provide effective management of responsibilities, a Groupement d'intérêt économique would be established, allowing the various partners to work together on the project while remaining separate business entities. On 18 December 1970, Airbus Industrie was formally established following an agreement between Aérospatiale (the newly merged Sud Aviation and Nord Aviation) of France and the antecedents to Deutsche Aerospace of Germany, each receiving a 50 per cent stake in the newly formed company. In 1971, the consortium was joined by a third full partner, the Spanish firm CASA, who received a 4.2 per cent stake, the other two members reducing their stakes to 47.9 per cent each. In 1979, Britain joined the Airbus consortium via British Aerospace, which Hawker Siddeley had merged into, which acquired a 20 per cent stake in Airbus Industrie with France and Germany each reducing their stakes to 37.9 per cent.

Prototype and flight testing

Airbus Industrie was initially headquartered in Paris, which is where design, development, flight testing, sales, marketing, and customer support activities were centered; the headquarters was relocated to Toulouse in January 1974. The final assembly line for the A300 was located adjacent to Toulouse Blagnac International Airport. The manufacturing process necessitated transporting each aircraft section being produced by the partner companies scattered across Europe to this one location. The combined use of ferries and roads were used for the assembly of the first A300, however this was time-consuming and not viewed as ideal by Felix Kracht, Airbus Industrie's production director. Kracht's solution was to have the various A300 sections brought to Toulouse by a fleet of Boeing 377-derived Aero Spacelines Super Guppy aircraft, by which means none of the manufacturing sites were more than two hours away. Having the sections airlifted in this manner made the A300 the first airliner to use just-in-time manufacturing techniques, and allowed each company to manufacture its sections as fully equipped, ready-to-fly assemblies.

In September 1969, construction of the first prototype A300 began. On 28 September 1972, this first prototype was unveiled to the public, it conducted its maiden flight from Toulouse–Blagnac International Airport on 28 October that year. This maiden flight, which was performed a month ahead of schedule, lasted for one hour and 25 minutes; the captain was Max Fischl and the first officer was Bernard Ziegler, son of Henri Ziegler. In 1972, unit cost was US$17.5M. On 5 February 1973, the second prototype performed its maiden flight. The flight test program, which involved a total of four aircraft, was relatively problem-free, accumulating 1,580 flight hours throughout. In September 1973, as part of promotional efforts for the A300, the new aircraft was taken on a six-week tour around North America and South America, to demonstrate it to airline executives, pilots, and would-be customers. Amongst the consequences of this expedition, it had allegedly brought the A300 to the attention of Frank Borman of Eastern Airlines, one of the "big four" U.S. airlines.

Entry into service
On 15 March 1974, type certificates were granted for the A300 from both German and French authorities, clearing the way for its entry into revenue service. On 23 May 1974, Federal Aviation Administration (FAA) certification was received. The first production model, the A300B2, entered service in 1974, followed by the A300B4 one year later. Initially, the success of the consortium was poor, in part due to the economic consequences of the 1973 oil crisis, but by 1979 there were 81 A300 passenger liners in service with 14 airlines, alongside 133 firm orders and 88 options. Ten years after the official launch of the A300, the company had achieved a 26 per cent market share in terms of dollar value, enabling Airbus Industries to proceed with the development of its second aircraft, the Airbus A310.

Design

The Airbus A300 is a wide-body medium-to-long range airliner; it has the distinction of being the first twin-engine wide-body aircraft in the world. In 1977, the A300 became the first Extended Range Twin Operations (ETOPS)-compliant aircraft, due to its high performance and safety standards. Another world-first of the A300 is the use of composite materials on a commercial aircraft, which were used on both secondary and later primary airframe structures, decreasing overall weight and improving cost-effectiveness. Other firsts included the pioneering use of center-of-gravity control, achieved by transferring fuel between various locations across the aircraft, and electrically signaled secondary flight controls.

The A300 is powered by a pair of underwing turbofan engines, either General Electric CF6 or Pratt & Whitney JT9D engines; the sole use of underwing engine pods allowed for any suitable turbofan engine to be more readily used. The lack of a third tail-mounted engine, as per the trijet configuration used by some competing airliners, allowed for the wings to be located further forwards and to reduce the size of the vertical stabilizer and elevator, which had the effect of increasing the aircraft's flight performance and fuel efficiency.

Airbus partners had employed the latest technology, some of which having been derived from Concorde, on the A300. According to Airbus, new technologies adopted for the airliner were selected principally for increased safety, operational capability, and profitability. Upon entry into service in 1974, the A300 was a very advanced plane, which went on to influence later airliner designs. The technological highlights include
advanced wings by de Havilland (later BAE Systems) with
supercritical airfoil sections for economical performance and
advanced aerodynamically efficient flight control surfaces.
The  diameter circular fuselage section allows an eight-abreast passenger seating and is wide enough for 2 LD3 cargo containers side by side.
Structures are made from metal billets, reducing weight.
It is the first airliner to be fitted with wind shear protection.
Its advanced autopilots are capable of flying the aircraft from climb-out to landing,
and it has an electrically controlled braking system.

Later A300s incorporated other advanced features such as the Forward-Facing Crew Cockpit, which enabled a two-pilot flight crew to fly the aircraft alone without the need for a flight engineer, the functions of which were automated; this two-man cockpit concept was a world-first for a wide-body aircraft. Glass cockpit flight instrumentation, which used cathode ray tube (CRT) monitors to display flight, navigation, and warning information, along with fully digital dual autopilots and digital flight control computers for controlling the spoilers, flaps, and leading-edge slats, were also adopted upon later-built models. Additional composites were also made use of, such as carbon-fiber-reinforced polymer (CFRP), as well as their presence in an increasing proportion of the aircraft's components, including the spoilers, rudder, air brakes, and landing gear doors. Another feature of later aircraft was the addition of wingtip fences, which improved aerodynamic performance and thus reduced cruise fuel consumption by about 1.5% for the A300-600.

In addition to passenger duties, the A300 became widely used by air freight operators; according to Airbus, it is the best selling freight aircraft of all time. Various variants of the A300 were built to meet customer demands, often for diverse roles such as aerial refueling tankers, freighter models (new-build and conversions), combi aircraft, military airlifter, and VIP transport. Perhaps the most visually unique of the variants is the A300-600ST Beluga, an oversize cargo-carrying model operated by Airbus to carry aircraft sections between their manufacturing facilities. The A300 was the basis for, and retained a high level of commonality with, the second airliner produced by Airbus, the smaller Airbus A310.

Operational history

On 23 May 1974, the first A300 to enter service performed the first commercial flight of the type, flying from Paris to London, for Air France.

Immediately after the launch, sales of the A300 were weak for some years, with most orders going to airlines that had an obligation to favor the domestically made product – notably Air France and Lufthansa, the first two airlines to place orders for the type. Following the appointment of Bernard Lathière as Henri Ziegler's replacement, an aggressive sales approach was adopted. Indian Airlines was the world's first domestic airline to purchase the A300, ordering three aircraft with three options. However, between December 1975 and May 1977, there were no sales for the type. During this period a number of "whitetail" A300s – completed but unsold aircraft – were completed and stored at Toulouse, and production fell to half an aircraft per month amid calls to pause production completely.

During the flight testing of the A300B2, Airbus held a series of talks with Korean Air on the topic of developing a longer-range version of the A300, which would become the A300B4. In September 1974, Korean Air placed an order for 4 A300B4s with options for 2 further aircraft; this sale was viewed as significant as it was the first non-European international airline to order Airbus aircraft. Airbus had viewed South-East Asia as a vital market that was ready to be opened up and believed Korean Air to be the 'key'.

Airlines operating the A300 on short haul routes were forced to reduce frequencies to try and fill the aircraft. As a result, they lost passengers to airlines operating more frequent narrow body flights. Eventually, Airbus had to build its own narrowbody aircraft (the A320) to compete with the Boeing 737 and McDonnell Douglas DC-9/MD-80. The savior of the A300 was the advent of ETOPS, a revised FAA rule which allows twin-engine jets to fly long-distance routes that were previously off-limits to them. This enabled Airbus to develop the aircraft as a medium/long range airliner.

In 1977, US carrier Eastern Air Lines leased four A300s as an in-service trial. Frank Borman, ex-astronaut and the then CEO of the airline, was impressed that the A300 consumed 30% less fuel, even less than expected, than his fleet of L-1011s. Borman proceeded to order 23 A300s, becoming the first U.S. customer for the type. This order is often cited as the point at which Airbus came to be seen as a serious competitor to the large American aircraft-manufacturers Boeing and McDonnell Douglas. Aviation author John Bowen alleged that various concessions, such as loan guarantees from European governments and compensation payments, were a factor in the decision as well. The Eastern Air Lines breakthrough was shortly followed by an order from Pan Am. From then on, the A300 family sold well, eventually reaching a total of 561 delivered aircraft.

In December 1977, Aerocondor Colombia became the first Airbus operator in Latin America, leasing one Airbus A300B4-2C, named Ciudad de Barranquilla.

During the late 1970s, Airbus adopted a so-called 'Silk Road' strategy, targeting airlines in the Far East. As a result, The aircraft found particular favor with Asian airlines, being bought by Japan Air System, Korean Air, China Eastern Airlines, Thai Airways International, Singapore Airlines, Malaysia Airlines, Philippine Airlines, Garuda Indonesia, China Airlines, Pakistan International Airlines, Indian Airlines, Trans Australia Airlines and many others. As Asia did not have restrictions similar to the FAA 60-minutes rule for twin-engine airliners which existed at the time, Asian airlines used A300s for routes across the Bay of Bengal and South China Sea.

In 1977, the A300B4 became the first ETOPS compliant aircraft, qualifying for Extended Twin Engine Operations over water, providing operators with more versatility in routing. In 1982 Garuda Indonesia became the first airline to fly the A300B4-200FF. By 1981, Airbus was growing rapidly, with over 400 aircraft sold to over forty airlines.

In 1989, Chinese operator China Eastern Airlines received its first A300; by 2006, the airline operated around 18 A300s, making it the largest operator of both the A300 and the A310 at that time. On 31 May 2014, China Eastern officially retired the last A300-600 in its fleet, having begun drawing down the type in 2010.

From 1997 to 2014, a single A300, designated A300 Zero-G, was operated by the European Space Agency (ESA), centre national d'études spatiales (CNES) and the German Aerospace Center (DLR) as a reduced-gravity aircraft for conducting research into microgravity; the A300 is the largest aircraft to ever have been used in this capacity. A typical flight would last for two and a half hours, enabling up to 30 parabolas to be performed per flight.

By the 1990s, the A300 was being heavily promoted as a cargo freighter. The largest freight operator of the A300 is FedEx Express, which has 65 A300 aircraft in service as of May 2022. UPS Airlines also operates 52 freighter versions of the A300.

The final version was the A300-600R and is rated for 180-minute ETOPS. The A300 has enjoyed renewed interest in the secondhand market for conversion to freighters; large numbers were being converted during the late 1990s. The freighter versions – either new-build A300-600s or converted ex-passenger A300-600s, A300B2s and B4s – account for most of the world freighter fleet after the Boeing 747 freighter.

The A300 provided Airbus the experience of manufacturing and selling airliners competitively. The basic fuselage of the A300 was later stretched (A330 and A340), shortened (A310), or modified into derivatives (A300-600ST Beluga Super Transporter). In 2006, unit cost of an -600F was $105 million. In March 2006, Airbus announced the impending closure of the A300/A310 final assembly line, making them the first Airbus aircraft to be discontinued. The final production A300, an A300F freighter, performed its initial flight on 18 April 2007, and was delivered to FedEx Express on 12 July 2007. Airbus has announced a support package to keep A300s flying commercially.
Airbus offers the A330-200F freighter as a replacement for the A300 cargo variants.

The life of UPS's fleet of 52 A300s, delivered from 2000 to 2006, will be extended to 2035 by a flight deck upgrade based around Honeywell Primus Epic avionics; new displays and flight management system (FMS), improved weather radar, a central maintenance system, and a new version of the current enhanced ground proximity warning system.
With a light usage of only two to three cycles per day, it will not reach the maximum number of cycles by then.
The first modification will be made at Airbus Toulouse in 2019 and certified in 2020.

As of July 2017, there are 211 A300s in service with 22 operators, with the largest operator being FedEx Express with 68 A300-600F aircraft.

Variants

A300B1

The A300B1 was the first variant to take flight. Only two prototypes of the variant were built before it was adapted into the A300B2, the first production variant of the airliner. The second prototype was leased to Trans European Airways in 1974.

A300B2

A300B2-100
Responding to a need for more seats from Air France, Airbus decided that the first production variant should be larger than the original prototype A300B1. Two prototypes were built and the variant made its maiden flight on 28 June 1973, became certified on 15 March 1974 and entered service with Air France on 23 May 1974.

A300B2-200
For the A300B2-200, originally designated as the A300B2K, Krueger flaps were introduced at the leading-edge root, the slat angles were reduced from 20 degrees to 16 degrees, and other lift related changes were made in order to introduce a high-lift system. This was done to improve performance when operating at high-altitude airports, where the air is less dense and lift generation is reduced. CF6-50C1 and CF6-50C2 models were also later fitted depending on customer requirements, these became certified on 22 February 1978 and 21 February 1980 respectively.

A300B2-320
The A300B2-320 introduced the Pratt & Whitney JT9D powerplant and was powered by JT9D-59A engines. It retained the  MTOW of the B2-200, was certified on 4 January 1980, and entered service with Scandinavian Airlines on 18 February 1980, with only four being produced.

A300B4

A300B4-100
It also featured Krueger flaps and had a similar high-lift system to what was later fitted to the A300B2-200. The variant made its maiden flight on 26 December 1974, was certified on 26 March 1975, and entered service with Germanair in May 1975.

A300B4-200
The variant was certified on 26 April 1979.

A300-600

The A300-600, officially designated as the A300B4-600, was slightly longer than the A300B2 and A300B4 variants and had an increased interior space from using a similar rear fuselage to the Airbus A310, this allowed it to have two additional rows of seats. It was initially powered by Pratt & Whitney JT9D-7R4H1 engines, but was later fitted with General Electric CF6-80C2 engines, with Pratt & Whitney PW4056 or PW4058 engines being introduced in 1986. Other changes include an improved wing featuring a recambered trailing edge, the incorporation of simpler single-slotted Fowler flaps, the deletion of slat fences, and the removal of the outboard ailerons after they were deemed unnecessary on the A310. The variant made its first flight on 8 July 1983, was certified on 9 March 1984, and entered service in June 1984 with Saudi Arabian Airlines. A total of 313 A300-600s (all versions) have been sold. The A300-600 uses the A310 cockpits, featuring digital technology and electronic displays, eliminating the need for a flight engineer. The FAA issues a single type rating which allows operation of both the A310 and A300-600.
 A300-600: (Official designation: A300B4-600) The baseline model of the −600 series.
 A300-620C: (Official designation: A300C4-620) A convertible-freighter version. Four delivered between 1984 and 1985.
 A300-600F: (Official designation: A300F4-600) The freighter version of the baseline −600.
 A300-600R: (Official designation: A300B4-600R) The increased-range −600, achieved by an additional trim fuel tank in the tail. First delivery in 1988 to American Airlines; all A300s built since 1989 (freighters included) are −600Rs. Japan Air System (later merged into Japan Airlines) took delivery of the last new-built passenger A300, an A300-622R, in November 2002.
 A300-600RC: (Official designation: A300C4-600R) The convertible-freighter version of the -600R. Two were delivered in 1999.
 A300-600RF: (Official designation: A300F4-600R) The freighter version of the −600R. All A300s delivered between November 2002 and 12 July 2007 (last ever A300 delivery) were A300-600RFs.

A300B10 (A310)

Airbus had demand for an aircraft smaller than the A300.
On 7 July 1978, the A310 (initially the A300B10) was launched with orders from Swissair and Lufthansa.
On 3 April 1982, the first prototype conducted its maiden flight and it received its type certification on 11 March 1983.

The A310 introduced a two-crew glass cockpit, later adopted for the A300-600 with a common type rating. It was powered by the same GE CF6-80 or Pratt & Whitney JT9D then PW4000 turbofans.
It has overwing exits between the two main front and rear door pairs.

In April 1983, the aircraft entered revenue service with Swissair and competed with the Boeing 767-200, introduced six months before.
Its longer range and ETOPS regulations allowed it to be operated on transatlantic flights. Until the last delivery in June 1998, 255 aircraft were produced, as it was succeeded by the larger Airbus A330-200.

It has cargo aircraft versions, and was derived into the Airbus A310 MRTT military tanker/transport.

A300-600ST

Commonly referred to as the Airbus Beluga or "Airbus Super Transporter," these five airframes are used by Airbus to ferry parts between the company's disparate manufacturing facilities, thus enabling workshare distribution. They replaced the four Aero Spacelines Super Guppys previously used by Airbus.

ICAO code: A3ST

Operators

, there were 229 A300 family aircraft in commercial service.
The five largest operators were FedEx Express (70), UPS Airlines (52), European Air Transport Leipzig (22), Iran Air (14), and Mahan Air (11).

Deliveries

Data through end of December 2007.

Accidents and incidents
As of June 2021, the A300 has been involved in 77 occurrences including 24 hull-loss accidents causing 1133 fatalities, and  criminal occurrences and hijackings causing  fatalities.

Accidents with fatalities

 21 September 1987: EgyptAir Airbus A300B4-203 touched down  past the runway threshold. The right main gear hit runway lights and the aircraft collided with an antenna and fences. No passengers were on board the plane, but 5 crew members were killed.
 28 September 1992: PIA Flight 268, an A300B4 crashed on approach near Kathmandu, Nepal. All 12 crew and 155 passengers perished.
 26 April 1994: China Airlines Flight 140 (Taiwan) crashed at the end of runway at Nagoya, Japan, killing all 15 crew and 249 of 256 passengers on board.
 26 September 1997: Garuda Indonesia Flight 152 was on approach to Polonia International Airport in Medan. The plane later crashed into a ravine in Buah Nabar due to ATC error and apparent haze that covers the country which limits the visibility. All 234 passengers and crew aboard perished in Indonesia's deadliest crash. 
 16 February 1998: China Airlines Flight 676 (Taiwan) crashed into a residential area close to CKS International Airport near Taipei, Taiwan. All 196 people on board were killed, including Taiwan's central bank president. Seven people on the ground were also killed.
 12 November 2001: American Airlines Flight 587 crashed into Belle Harbor—a neighborhood in Queens, New York, United States—shortly after takeoff from John F. Kennedy International Airport. The vertical stabilizer ripped off the aircraft after the rudder was mishandled during wake turbulence.  All 260 people on board were killed, along with 5 people on the ground. It is the second-deadliest incident involving an A300 to date and the second-deadliest aircraft incident on United States soil.
 14 April 2010: AeroUnion Flight 302, an A300B4-203F, crashed on a road  short of the runway while attempting to land at Monterrey Airport in Mexico. Seven people (five crew members and two on the ground) were killed.
 14 August 2013: UPS Flight 1354, an Airbus A300F4-622R, crashed outside the perimeter fence on approach to Birmingham–Shuttlesworth International Airport in Birmingham, Alabama, United States. Both crew members died.

Hull losses
 18 December 1983: Malaysian Airline System Flight 684, an Airbus A300B4 leased from Scandinavian Airlines System (SAS), registration OY-KAA, crashed short of the runway at Kuala Lumpur in bad weather while attempting to land on a flight from Singapore. All 247 persons aboard escaped unharmed but the aircraft was destroyed in the resulting fire.
 24 April 1993: an Air Inter Airbus A300B2-1C was written off after colliding with a light pole while being pushed back at Montpellier.
 In November 1993, an Indian Airlines A300 plane crash landed near Hyderabad airport. There were no deaths but the aircraft was written off.
 10 August 1994 – Korean Air Flight 2033 (Airbus A300) from Seoul to Jeju, the flight approached faster than usual to avoid potential windshear. Fifty feet above the runway the co-pilot, who was not flying the aircraft, decided that there was insufficient runway left to land and tried to perform a go-around against the captain's wishes.[18] The aircraft touched down 1,773 meters beyond the runway threshold. The aircraft could not be stopped on the remaining 1,227 meters of runway and overran at a speed of 104 knots. After striking the airport wall and a guard post at 30 knots, the aircraft burst into flames and was incinerated. The cabin crew was credited with safely evacuating all passengers although only half of the aircraft's emergency exits were usable}
  1 March 2004, Pakistan International Airlines Flight 2002 burst 2 tyres whilst taking off from King Abdulaziz International Airport. Fragments of the tyre were ingested by the engines, this caused the engines to catch fire and an aborted takeoff was performed. Due to the fire substantial damage to the engine and the left wing caused the aircraft to be written off. All 261 passengers and 12 crew survived.
 16 November 2012: an Air Contractors Airbus A300B4-203(F) EI-EAC, operating flight QY6321 on behalf of EAT Leipzig from Leipzig (Germany) to Bratislava (Slovakia), suffered a nose wheel collapse during roll out after landing at Bratislava's M. R. Štefánik Airport. All three crew members survived unharmed, the aircraft was written off. As of December 2017, the aircraft still was parked at a remote area of the airport between runways 13 and 22.
 12 October 2015: An Airbus A300B4-200F Freighter operated by Egyptian Tristar cargo carrier crashed in Mogadishu, Somalia. All the passengers and crew members survived the crash.
 1 October 2016: An Airbus A300-B4 registration PR-STN on a cargo flight between São Paulo-Guarulhos and Recife suffered a runway excursion after landing and the aft gear collapsed upon touchdown, in which the aircraft is still abandoned at airport

Violent incidents 
 27 June 1976: Air France Flight 139, originating in Tel Aviv, Israel and carrying 248 passengers and a crew of 12 took off from Athens, Greece, headed for Paris, France. The flight was hijacked by terrorists, and was eventually flown to Entebbe Airport in Uganda.  At the airport, Israeli commandos rescued 102 of the 106 hostages.
 26 October 1986: Thai Airways Flight 620, an Airbus A300B4-601, originating in Bangkok suffered an explosion mid-flight. The aircraft descended rapidly and was able to land safely at Osaka. The aircraft was later repaired and there were no fatalities. The cause was a hand grenade brought onto the plane by a Japanese gangster of the Yamaguchi-gumi. 62 of the 247 people on board were injured.
  3 July 1988: Iran Air Flight 655 was shot down by USS Vincennes in the Persian Gulf after being mistaken for an attacking Iranian F-14 Tomcat, killing all 290 passengers and crew.
 15 February 1991: two Kuwait Airways A300C4-620s and two Boeing 767s that had been seized during Iraq's occupation of Kuwait were destroyed in coalition bombing of Mosul Airport.
 24 December 1994: Air France Flight 8969 was hijacked at Houari Boumedienne Airport in Algiers, by four terrorists who belonged to the Armed Islamic Group. The terrorists apparently intended to crash the plane over the Eiffel Tower on Boxing Day. After a failed attempt to leave Marseille following a confrontational firefight between the terrorists and the GIGN French Special Forces, the result was the death of all four terrorists. (Snipers on the terminal front's roof shot dead two of the terrorists. The other two terrorists died as a result of gunshots in the cabin after approximately 20 minutes.) Three hostages including a Vietnamese diplomat were executed in Algiers, 229 hostages survived, many of them wounded by shrapnel. The almost 15-year-old aircraft was written off.
 24 December 1999: Indian Airlines Flight IC 814 from Kathmandu, Nepal, to New Delhi was hijacked. After refueling and offloading a few passengers, the flight was diverted to Kandahar, Afghanistan. A Nepalese man was murdered while the plane was in flight.
 22 November 2003: European Air Transport OO-DLL, operating on behalf of DHL Aviation, was hit by an SA-14 'Gremlin' missile after takeoff from Baghdad International Airport. The aeroplane lost hydraulic pressure and thus the controls. After extending the landing gear to create more drag, the crew piloted the plane using differences in engine thrust and landed the plane with minimal further damage. The plane was repaired and offered for sale, but in April 2011 it still remained parked at Baghdad Intl.
 25 August 2011: an A300B4-620 5A-IAY of Afriqiyah Airways and A300B4-622 5A-DLZ of Libyan Arab Airlines were both destroyed in fighting between pro- and anti-Gadaffi forces at Tripoli International Airport.

Aircraft on display

Four A300s are currently preserved:
F-BUAD Airbus A300 ZERO-G, since August 2015 preserved at Cologne Bonn Airport, Germany.
ex-HL7219 Korean Air Airbus A300B4 preserved at Korean Air Jeongseok Airfield.
ex-N11984 Continental Airlines Airbus A300B4 preserved in South Korea as a Night Flight Restaurant.
ex-PK-JID Sempati Air Airbus A300B4 repainted in first A300B1 prototype colours, including original F-WUAB registration, became an exhibit in 2014 at the Aeroscopia museum in Blagnac, near Toulouse, France.

Specifications

See also

References

Further reading

External links

 
 

 
A300
1970s international airliners
Twinjets
Articles containing video clips
Low-wing aircraft
Aircraft first flown in 1972
Wide-body aircraft